Farish may refer to:

Places
 Forish, a village in Jizzakh Region, Uzbekistan, also romanised as Farish

People

Given name
 Farish Jenkins (1940–2012), American paleontologist
 Farish A. Noor (born 1967), Malaysian political scientist and historian
 Farish Carter Tate (1856–1922), American politician

Surname
 Catherine Farish (born 1951), Canadian artist
 Donald J. Farish (1942–2018), American biologist
Hazlewood Power Farish (1880–1958), American politician
 Helen Farish (born 1962), British poet
 James Farish ( 1838–41), British colonial administrator
 Oscar Eugene Farish (1868–1917), American businessman and politician
 Ryan Farish (21st century), American electronica artist
 Stephen Farish (born 1970), English bowls player
 William Farish (chemist) (1759–1837), British chemist
 William Stamps Farish II (1881–1942), American businessman
 William Stamps Farish III (born 1939), American businessman

See also
 Graham Farish, British producer of model railway equipment
 Farris (surname)
 Farrish, a surname